Agdistis sissia is a moth in the family Pterophoridae. It is known from Turkey, Armenia, Turkmenistan, Azerbaijan, Iran, and Georgia.

References

Agdistinae
Moths described in 1987